Spanish euro coins feature three different designs for each of the three series of coins. The minor series of 1, 2, and 5 cent coins were designed by Garcilaso Rollán, the middle series of 10, 20, and 50 cent coins by Begoña Castellanos, and the two major coins feature the portrait of King Felipe VI of Spain. All designs feature the 12 stars of the EU, the year of minting, and the word España (Spanish for Spain).

Current series 
In 2010, Spain updated their national sides in order to comply with the European commission recommendations. In the €1 and €2 coins, the same portrait of king Juan Carlos I was used, but the year position was placed in the inner part of the coin. Moreover, the twelve star ring no longer contained chiselled sections. The chiselled sections were also removed from designs for the other coins.

In 2015, the portrait on the €1 and €2 coins was changed to that of the new King Felipe VI following his father's abdication the previous year.

Circulating Mintage quantities

Identifying marks

€2 commemorative coins

Spanish UNESCO World Heritage Sites series 
Spain started the commemorative coin series  (UNESCO World Heritage) in 2010, commemorating all of Spain's UNESCO World Heritage Sites, which could continue until 2058. The order in which the coin for a specific site is issued coincides with the order in which they were declared a UNESCO World Heritage site. The coins issued are:

Gold and silver commemorative coins

References

External links 

European Central Bank – Spain

Euro coins by issuing country
Euro coins
Euro